Ahmad bin Ali Stadium, popularly known as the Al-Rayyan Stadium, is an association football stadium located in the district of Rawdat Al Jahhaniya, Qatar, around  northwest from the centre of Al Rayyan. It is currently used mostly for football matches and it is the home to Al-Rayyan Sports Club. The stadium is named after Ahmad bin Ali Al Thani, the Emir of Qatar from 1960 to 1972. The former stadium, built in 2003, had a seating capacity of 21,282 and was demolished in 2015. The new Al Rayyan Stadium has a seating capacity of 45,000.

The stadium is located about 20 km west of Doha.

Construction
The Ahmad bin Ali Stadium is one of eight stadiums being used in the 2022 FIFA World Cup in Qatar.

The former Ahmad bin Ali Stadium was demolished in 2015 to make way for the Al Rayyan Stadium. 90 percent of the rubble resulting from the demolition of the stadium is anticipated to be reused either for the new stadium or for public art projects.

The construction of the new stadium started in early 2016. This was done by the joint venture between Al-Balagh and Larsen & Toubro. After the World Cup the stadium will be reduced to 21,000 seats. The new stadium was built for the 2022 FIFA World Cup, which Qatar is currently hosting.

The renovation includes a huge 'media facade' with a membrane that will act as a screen for projections, news, commercials, sports updates, current tournament information and matches. Seating capacity was increased to 40,740, and all seats were shaded.

The inauguration of the stadium took place on 18 December 2020, which was Qatar's National Day, and exactly two years before the country hosts the 2022 FIFA World Cup final. The stadium was one of two venues used for the 2020 FIFA Club World Cup.

The stadium hosted four matches during FIFA Arab Cup 2021.

Recent tournament results

17th Arabian Gulf Cup

Football at the 2005 West Asian Games

Football at the 2006 Asian Games - Men's tournament

2011 AFC Asian Cup

Football at the 2011 Pan Arab Games

2021 FIFA Arab Cup

2022 FIFA World Cup

Ahmad bin Ali Stadium hosted seven matches during the 2022 FIFA World Cup.

References

External links

Al-Rayyan Stadium Project

2022 FIFA World Cup stadiums
Sports venues completed in 2003
Football venues in Qatar
Multi-purpose stadiums in Qatar
Sport in Al Rayyan
Al-Rayyan SC
2003 establishments in Qatar